Harianto (born in Malang, East Java 26 October 1977) is an Indonesian footballer, he normally plays as a wing back and is 167 cm. Now in Persik he became the captain and team mascot.

He played for Persik in the 2004 AFC Champions League group stage, where he scored one goal.

Achievements

With Persik Kediri
Helped Persik 2 times winning Liga Indonesia Premier Division (2003 and 2006)
Helped Persik 1 time winning Liga Indonesia First Division and promotion to Premier Division (2002)

References

External links 
 

Indonesian footballers
1977 births
Living people
Sportspeople from Malang
Persik Kediri players
Liga 1 (Indonesia) players
Indonesian Premier Division players
Persebaya Surabaya players
Mitra Kukar players
Persija Jakarta players
Arema F.C. players
Persidafon Dafonsoro players
Association football defenders